Cœur double ("Double Heart") is the first collection of short stories by the French author Marcel Schwob. The book was published by Ollendorff in Paris in July 1891, and was dedicated to Robert Louis Stevenson, a powerful influence on Schwob's work. With its evocative language and its combination of sensual and macabre elements it attracted the admiration of many reviewers, including Anatole France, and, initially, a small circle of readers.

1891 short story collections
French short story collections